Muncel may refer to several places in Romania:

Populated places
 Muncel, a village in Câțcău Commune, Cluj County
 Muncel, a village in Cristolț Commune, Sălaj County

Rivers
 Muncel, a tributary of the Bistricioara in Harghita County
 Muncel, a tributary of the Bistrița in Bistrița-Năsăud County
Muncel, a tributary of the Crivadia in Hunedoara County
 Muncel, a tributary of the Someș in Cluj County

See also 
 Muncelu (disambiguation)